

Akhund or Akhoond is a Persian title or surname for Islamic scholars in Iran, Afghanistan, Tajikistan, Pakistan, Bangladesh and Azerbaijan.

Akhund may also refer to:

Places
Akhund, Iran (disambiguation), a number of places in Iran

People

Title or first name
Akhund Darweza (1553-1638), Sufi and Islamic scholar, one of the caliphs of Sayyid Ali Tirmizi
Akhund Azizullah Muttalawi, Muslim theologian from Sindh, translator of the Quran from Arabic into Sindhi
Akhund Mullah Mohammad Kashani, 19th century Islamic mystic, philosopher, sage, Shiite scholar

Surname

Akhund
Abdul Haq Akhund, Deputy Interior Minister for Counter Narcotics in Afghanistan
Hají Ákhúnd, title of Ḥají Mullá ʻAlí-Akbar S͟hahmírzádí, eminent follower of Baháʼu'lláh, the founder of the Baháʼí Faith
Hasan Akhund, Prime Minister of the Islamic Emirate of Afghanistan from 2021
Mohammed Isa Akhund, Minister of Minerals and Petroleum in Afghanistan
Mullah Shirin Akhund, Governor of Kabul, Afghanistan
Obaidullah Akhund (c. 1968 – 2010), Defence Minister under the Taliban government in Afghanistan

Akhoond
Imran Muhammad Akhoond, Pakistani guitarist, music composer songwriter